Rodnikovy is a rural locality (a selo) in Madzhalissky Selsoviet, Kaytagsky District, Republic of Dagestan, Russia. The population was 757 as of 2010. There are 21 streets.

Geography 
Rodnikovy is located 11 km northeast of Madzhalis (the district's administrative centre) by road. Madzhalis and Sanchi are the nearest rural localities.

Nationalities 
Dargins live there.

References 

Rural localities in Kaytagsky District